Laura was an  coaster that was built in 1908 by Kjøbenhavns Flydedok & Skibsværft, Copenhagen, Denmark for Danish owners.

A sale in 1935 saw her renamed Sylt. She was seized by the Allies in May 1945, passed to the Ministry of War Transport (MoWT) and was renamed Empire Continent., then Master Nicholas following a sale in 1947. In 1952, she was sold to Greece and renamed Soussana II. A further sale in 1955 saw her renamed Georgios Matsas.

On 18 April 1955, she struck a reef off Muros, Spain and sank. Although Georgios Matsas was refloated two months later, she was declared a constructive total loss. Despite this, she was sold to Panama, repaired and renamed Sur, serving until 1965 when she was scrapped.

Description
The ship was built in 1908 by Kjøbenhavns Flydedok & Skibsværft, Copenhagen.

As built the ship had a GRT of 787.

The engine was built by Kjøbenhavns Flydedok & Skibsværft.

History
Laura was built for A/S Dampskibs Selskab Vesterhavet. She was operated under the management of  J. Lauritzen A/S, Esbjerg. The Code Letters NRDG were allocated.

In 1935, Laura was sold to Wendenhof Reederei GmbH, Wismar and was renamed Sylt. In 1940, the ship was requisitioned by the Kriegsmarine. On 21 July 1943, she sailed from Bodø, Norway under escort from the vorpostenboot  for a port to the north. In May 1945, Sylt was seized by the Allies at Trondheim, Norway. She was passed to the MoWT and renamed Empire Continent. Her port of registry was changed to London. The Code Letters GQBN and United Kingdom Official Number 180805 were allocated.

In 1947, Empire Continent was sold to A G Tsavliris Ltd, London and was renamed Master Nicolas. In 1952, she was sold to N T Papadatos, Greece and was renamed Soussana II. In 1955, she was sold to Loucas G Matsas, Piraeus, and renamed Georgios Matsas. On 18 April 1955, she struck rocks off Muros, Spain and subsequently sank. The ship was refloated on 17 June but was declared to be a constructive total loss. Georgios Matsas was sold and repaired. She was then sold to Dabaco & Co, Panama and renamed Sur, serving until she was scrapped in Santander, Spain in August 1965.

References

1908 ships
Ships built in Copenhagen
Steamships of Denmark
World War I merchant ships of Denmark
Maritime incidents in 1917
Captured ships
World War I merchant ships of Germany
Steamships of Germany
Merchant ships of Germany
World War II merchant ships of Germany
Auxiliary ships of the Kriegsmarine
Ministry of War Transport ships
Empire ships
Steamships of the United Kingdom
Merchant ships of the United Kingdom
Steamships of Greece
Merchant ships of Greece
Maritime incidents in 1955
Steamships of Panama
Merchant ships of Panama
Maritime incidents in Spain